Jack Diment ( ????– 1 January 1978) was a Scottish footballer who played as midfielder.

Career 
He played for Newcastle United between 1903 and 1905.

Diment played for Juventus in 1905, to work as a clerk in the transport company Walter & Becker, and played for Juventus for the next three seasons.

His debut took place against US Milanese on 5 March 1905, in a 3–0 win. His last match was against Torino on 4 February 1907, in a 4–1 defeat. He made 11 appearances for Juventus without scoring any goals. He won the first ever scudetto with Juventus.

In 1908, he moved to Torino. With the club, he got to the second round of the 1909 Prima Categoria.

In 1909, he moved to Milan. He reached the sixth place in the 1909–10 Prima Categoria with the club.

Style of play 
Diment was a left footed midfielder.

Honours 
Juventus

Prima Categoria: 1905

Notes

References 

1978 deaths
Juventus F.C. players
Torino F.C. players
A.C. Milan players
Year of birth missing
Scottish footballers
Association football midfielders
Newcastle United F.C. players